Momčilo "Moca" Vukotić (Serbian Cyrillic: Moмчилo Моца Bукoтић; 2 June 19503 December 2021) was a Serbian football coach and player.

He played 14 times for his national team, Yugoslavia, between 1969 and 1974 scoring four goals. In his club career in FK Partizan, he appeared in a total of 752 games in all competitions and all age levels, scoring 306 goals. He won the Yugoslav Championship three times.

Playing career
Vukotić started playing for FK Partizan in 1962, at the age of 12.

He began his professional career as a player for FK Partizan in 1968, he won his first Yugoslav Championship in 1976 and the second in 1978. He also played for the Yugoslavia national team and participated in the European Championship in 1976, which was hosted in his country, where Yugoslavia finished fourth.

In 1978, Vukotić transferred to the French side FC Bordeaux, where he played for one season, scoring eight goals in 36 games. The following year, he returned to Partizan, and won the Yugoslav Championship a third and last time in 1982–83. He finished his career as player in 1984. He scored 33 goals in 138 games between 1980 and 1984.

Coaching career
Vukotić became a coach in 1988. From 1988 to 1999 he coached FK Partizan, Panionios, Apollon Limassol, Nea Salamis Famagusta FC, Ethnikos Achna FC. As a coach of the Cypriot team Ethnikos, the team finished in the fourth position in the Cypriot Championship, the best position that the club achieved in its history. He became the assistant coach of Yugoslavia, but he failed to qualify his team to the 2002 FIFA World Cup, because of one point less than the second Slovenia, Yugoslavia remained third.

After Yugoslavia, he continued working as a national team coach, this time for Cyprus and his team finished 4th in the 2004 UEFA European Football Championship qualifying, collecting eight points and some criticism began for Vukotić. The bad beginning for the 2006 FIFA World Cup qualification where at the first five matches, Cyprus won only one point – and that in a home tie match against Faroe Islands – was enough for him to resign as a coach.

He has been in charge at FC Farul Constanța since January 2006. Under his guidance Farul reached the semi-finals of the Romanian Cup, finished 7th in the Romanian First Division (then known as Divizia A, now known as Liga 1) and most important reached the 3rd Round of the UEFA Intertoto Cup losing to AJ Auxerre (4–1 away and winning at home 1–0). This was the second entry in the European Cups for Farul. Several players from Farul accused Vukotić of using an ineffective defensive style. Vukotić main objective for the 2006–07 season was to qualify for Europe next year, but he was released early on into the season after some poor results.

In October 2006, he became the head coach of PAOK, but got released in January 2007. In January 2011, he became the coach of Panserraikos.

He was the director of the FK Partizan Academy from 2012 to 2015 and the president from 2015 to 2017.

Death
Vukotić died from throat cancer on 3 December 2021, in Belgrade.

Career statistics
Scores and results list Yugoslavia's goal tally first, score column indicates score after each Vukotić goal.

Honours
Partizan
 Yugoslav First League: 1976, 1978, 1983

References

External links
 
 

1950 births
2021 deaths
Deaths from throat cancer
Footballers from Belgrade
Serbian footballers
Yugoslav footballers
Yugoslavia international footballers
UEFA Euro 1976 players
Association football midfielders
Association football forwards
Yugoslav First League players
Ligue 1 players
FK Partizan players
FC Girondins de Bordeaux players
Yugoslav expatriate footballers
Expatriate footballers in France
Yugoslav expatriate sportspeople in France
Yugoslav football managers
Serbian football managers
Cyprus national football team managers
FK Partizan managers
Panionios F.C. managers
PAOK FC managers
Panserraikos F.C. managers
Apollon Limassol FC managers
Serbia and Montenegro expatriate football managers
Serbian expatriate football managers
Expatriate football managers in Cyprus
Serbia and Montenegro expatriate sportspeople in Cyprus
Nea Salamis Famagusta FC managers
FCV Farul Constanța managers